Epilepia is a genus of snout moths (family Pyralidae). It was described by Anthonie Johannes Theodorus Janse in 1931.

Species
 Epilepia dentatum
 Epilepia melanobasis (Hampson, 1906)
 Epilepia melanobrunnea (Janse, 1922)
 Epilepia melanosparsalis Janse, 1922
 Epilepia meyi Speidel, 2007
 Epilepia melapastalis (Hampson, 1906)
 Epilepia simulata Janse, 1931

References

Epipaschiinae
Pyralidae genera